Andrea Di Paolo (born in Atessa, Italy, on 24 February 1978) is an Italian pianist and composer of contemporary classical music and neoclassical music.

Biography 
Andrea Di Paolo began studying music at age 8. He studied piano (Bachelor and Master degree) with Maria Cristina Boccadamo at the "D'Annunzio" Conservatory in Pescara (Abruzzo - Italy)  and Composition at the Cité de la Musique et de la Danse, Conservatoire de Strasbourg (Strasbourg, France) with Mark André. In 2010, he got a Diploma of high specialization in Composition at the National Academy of Santa Cecilia (Rome, Italy) with Ivan Fedele; fundamental in his human and artistical development was his meeting with composer Valentyn Sylvestrov in Kyiv (Ukraine).

He attended composition classes of Luciano Berio, Arvo Part, Gyorgy Kurtag, Salvatore Sciarrino, Beat Furrer. His works, for solo instrument, ensemble and orchestra, were performed in Europe, Russia and USA, broadcast by Radio France and Radio RAI.

In 2008 he won the International Competition for composers “From Romanticism to Contemporary” in Bucharest (Romania), sponsored by the European Commission with his work “L’azur” from a Mallarmé’s text.

Andrea Di Paolo has collaborated with: Lvyv Symphonic Orchestra, Valentin Silvestrov, Ensemble Algoritmo, Ensemble "Accroche Note", Solisti Aquilani, Armand Angster, Mario Caroli, Liliya Gratyla, Luce Zurita, Valeria Kurbatova, Dima Nikolaev, Ensemble Ricochet, Olexandr Kozarenko, Francois Kubler, Marco Rogliano, Lamberg String Quartet, Ivanna Mytrogann, Alexander Zagorinski, Marco Angius, Modular Quartet, Dmytro Tavanets, Clement Fauconnet, Galician Camera Choir, Pauline Haas, Vasil Yazziniak, Igor Shcherbakov, Tonino Guerra, Aram Gharabekian, National Chamber Orchestra of Armenia.

Since 2009 he teaches Composition, Harmony and Analysis in Italian Conservatories; he is actually teaching Harmony and Analysis at the “Niccolò Piccini” Conservatory in Bari (Italy).

Works 
 L'azur  - for Soprano and Piano (2007, rev. 2015) -  
 Five Spaces of Stones - for Ensemble (2009) -  
 Rudere - for Harp and String quartet (2009) -  
 Tundra - for Amplified Ensemble (2010) -  
 Arcaica - for Percussion Ensemble (2011, rev. 2014) -  
 Cello Sonata - for Violoncello solo (2011) -  
 Nur - for String Trio (2012) -  
 Das Universum - String Quartet No.1 (2012, rev. 2013) -  
 De Profundis (for the victims of Holocaust) - for Mixed Choir (2013) -  
 In Quiete for Morton F. - for Flute and Harp (2014) -  
 Temple of Hera - for String Orchestra (2012, rev. 2015) -  
 Planetarium - for Piano (10 preludes) (2013 - 2016) -

Discography 
 2014: Tundra (coronaustralis, 55:48) ASIN: B010GUPX32 
 2015: Das Universum (coronaustralis, 1:00:37) ASIN: B00ZGS060K

References

External links 
 Official web site
 Topic on L'Azur for Soprano and Piano (italian)

20th-century classical composers
21st-century classical composers
Living people
Accademia Nazionale di Santa Cecilia alumni
1978 births
Italian classical composers
20th-century Italian composers